The Lancelot-Grail, also known as the Vulgate Cycle or the Pseudo-Map Cycle, is an early 13th-century French Arthurian literary cycle consisting of interconnected prose episodes of chivalric romance in Old French. The cycle of unknown authorship, presenting itself as a chronicle of actual events, retells the legend of King Arthur by focusing on the love affair between Lancelot and Guinevere as well as the religious quest for the Holy Grail, expanding on the works of Robert de Boron and Chrétien de Troyes.

There is no unity of place, but most of the episodes take place in Arthur's kingdom of Logres. One of the main characters is Arthur himself, around whom gravitates a host of other heroes, many of whom are Knights of the Round Table. Among them is the famed Lancelot, whose chivalric tale is centered around his illicit romance with Arthur's wife, Queen Guinevere. However, the cycle also tells of adventures of a more spiritual type; those involve the Holy Grail, the vessel that contained the blood of Christ, for which many of the members of the Round Table are searching, with Lancelot's son Galahad ultimately emerging as the winner of this sacred contest. Other major narratives include the life of Merlin and the stories of rise and fall of Arthur.

After its completion around 1230–1235, the Lancelot–Grail was soon followed by its major rewrite known as the Post-Vulgate Cycle. Together, the two cycles,  with their multiple variants and abundance of characters, represent a major source of the Arthurian legend as they constituted a highly influential and most widespread form of Arthurian romance literature during their time and also contributed the most to the later English compilation Le Morte d'Arthur that formed the basis for Arthuriana's modern canon.

Composition and authorship

The Vulgate Cycle emphasizes Christian themes in the legend of King Arthur, in particular in the story of the Holy Grail. Like Robert de Boron's original poem Merlin (c. 1195–1210), the cycle states that its first parts are derived from the Livre du Graal ("The Book of the Grail"), described as a text dictated by Merlin himself to his confessor  in the early years of Arthur's reign. Next, following the demise of Merlin, the supposed original (fictitious) authors of the later parts of the cycle are named (in one of several spelling variants) as Arodiens de Cologne (Arodian of Cologne), Tantalides de Vergeaus (Tantalides of Vercelli), Thumas de Toulete (Thomas of Toledo), and Sapiens de Baudas (Sapient of Baghdad), the scribes who served Arthur and recorded the deeds of the Knights of the Round Table, including the grand Grail Quest, as relayed to them by the eyewitnesses of the events beings told. It is uncertain whether the medieval readers actually believed in the truthfulness of the centuries-old "chronicle" characterisation or if they recognised it as a contemporary work of creative fiction.

Welsh writer Gautier (Walter) Map (c. 1140–1209) is attributed to be the editing author, as can be seen in the notes and illustrations in some manuscripts describing his discovery in an archive at Salisbury of the chronicle of Camelot, supposedly dating from the times of Arthur, and his translation of these documents from Latin to Old French as ordered by Henry II of England (the location was changed from Salisbury to the mystical Avalon in a later Welsh redaction). Map's connection has been discounted by modern scholarship, however, as he died too early to be the author and the work is distinctly continental.

The cycle's actual authorship is unknown, but most scholars today believe it was written by multiple authors. There might have been either a single master-mind planner, the so-called "architect" (as first called so by Jean Frappier, who compared the process to building a cathedral), who may have written the main section (Lancelot Proper), and then overseen the work of multiple other anonymous scribes. One theory identified the initiator as French queen Eleanor of Aquitaine, who would have set up the project already in 1194. Alternately, each part may have been composed separately, arranged gradually, and rewritten for consistency and cohesiveness. Regarding the question of the author of the Lancelot, Ferdinand Lot suggested an anonymous clerical court clerk of aristocratic background.

Today it is believed by some (such as editors of the Encyclopædia Britannica) that a group of anonymous French Catholic monks wrote the cycleor at least the Queste part (where, according to Fanni Bogdanow, the text's main purpose is to convince sinners to repent), as evident by its very Cistercian spirit of Christian mysticism (with Augustinian intrusions). Others doubt this, however, and a compromise theory postulates a more secular writer who had spent some time in a Cistercian monastery. Richard Barber described the Cistercian theology of the Queste as unconventional and complex but subtle, noting its success in appealing to the courtly audience accustomed to more secular romances.

Structure, history and synopsis
The Lancelot-Grail Cycle can be divided into three main branches (some categorizations have either the Mort or both the Queste and the Mort regarded as separate sections independent of the Lancelot for the total of five branches). The last one (or the last three within the other system) was actually the first to be written (beginning c. 1210–1215). The first two, serving as prequels, joined them later (before c. 1235). Compared to the 12th-century tradition of Arthurian romances in verse, the original so-called "short version" of the cycle has a narrative structure closer to the modern novel, in which multiple events develop in parallel and intertwine through to the technique known as interlace, which is most prominent in the Queste.

History of the Holy Grail

The Vulgate Estoire del Saint Graal (Story of the Holy Grail) is the religious tale of early Christian Joseph of Arimathea and how his son Josephus brought the Holy Grail to Britain from the Holy Land. Set several centuries prior to the main story, it is derived from Robert de Boron's poem Joseph d'Arimathie with new characters and episodes added.

History of Merlin
The Vulgate Estoire de Merlin (Story of Merlin), or just the Vulgate Merlin, concerns Merlin and the early life of Arthur. It is a redaction of the Prose Merlin, itself a conversion of Robert de Boron's poem by the same title. It can be divided into:

 The Vulgate Merlin propre (Merlin Proper), also known as the Roman de Merlin (Novel of Merlin), directly based on Robert's Merlin.

The Vulgate Suite du Merlin (Continuation of Merlin) / Suite Vulgate du Merlin / Vulgate-Suite, also known as Les Premiers Faits [du roi Arthur] (The First Acts of King Arthur) or the Vulgate Merlin Continuation, drawing from a variety of other sources, adds more of Arthur's and Gawain's early deeds in which they are being aided by Merlin, in particular in their early wars of internal struggles for power and against foreign enemies (Saxons and Romans), ending in Arthur's marriage with Guinevere and the restoration of peace, as well as the disappearance of Merlin caused by the Lady of the Lake. It is roughly four times longer than the first part.

 A distinctively alternate revision of the Suite du Merlin found in a single, unfinished manuscript (BNF fr. 337), written at the end of the 13th century, is known as the Livre d'Artus (Book of Arthur).

Prose Lancelot

The Lancelot en prose, also known the Estoire de Lancelot (Story of Lancelot), follows the adventures of the eponymous hero Lancelot as well as many other Knights of the Round Table during the later years of King Arthur's reign until its end following the Grail Quest. The Lancelot–Queste–Mort Artu trilogy is made of three main sections, of which tone the first (composed c. 1215–1220) can be characterized as colorful, the second (c. 1220–1225) as pious, and the third (c. 1225–1230) as sober:

 The Vulgate Lancelot propre (Lancelot Proper), also known as the Roman de Lancelot (Novel of Lancelot) or just Lancelot du Lac, is the longest part, making up fully half of the entire cycle. It is inspired by and in part based on Chrétien's poem Lancelot, le Chevalier de la Charrette (Lancelot, or the Knight of the Cart). It primarily deals with a series of episodes of the early life of Lancelot and the courtly love between him and Queen Guinevere, as well as his deep friendship with Galehaut, interlaced with the adventures of Gawain and other knights such as Yvain, Hector, Lionel, and Bors.

 The actual [Conte de la] Charrette ("[Tale of the] Cart"), an incorporation of a prose version of Chrétien's poem, spans only a small part of the Vulgate Lancelot. Due to its length, modern scholars often divide the Lancelot into various sub-sections, including the Galehaut, further split between the Charrette and its follow-up the Suite de la Charette (Continuation of the Charrette); the Agravain (named after Gawain's brother Agravain); and the Preparation for the Quest linking the previous ones.

 The Vulgate Queste del Saint Graal (Quest for the Holy Grail), or just the Vulgate Queste, is another highly religious part of the cycle. It relates how the Grail Quest is undertaken by various knights including Perceval and Bors, and achieved by Lancelot's son Galahad, who here replaces both Lancelot and Perceval as the chosen hero. It is purported to be narrated by Bors, the witness of these events after the deaths of Galahad and Perceval.

 The Vulgate Mort le roi Artu (Death of King Arthur), or just the Vulgate Mort Artu / La Mort Artu, a tragic account of further wars culminating in the king and his illegitimate son Mordred killing each other. The ruin of Arthur's kingdom is here presented as the disastrous direct consequence of the sin of Lancelot's and Guinevere's adulterous affair. Lancelot eventually dies too, as do the other protagonists who did not die in the Queste, leaving only Bors as a survivor of the Round Table.

Possible non-cyclic Lancelot
The Lancelot Proper part of the cycle is regarded as having been written first. It was perhaps originally an independent romance that would begin with Lancelot's birth and finish with a happy end of him discovering his true identity and receiving a kiss from Guinevere when he confesses his love for her. Elspeth Kennedy identified the possible non-cyclic Prose Lancelot in an early manuscript known as the BNF fr. 768. It is about three times shorter than the later editions and notably the Grail Quest (usually taking place later) is mentioned within the text as already completed by Perceval alone.

Manuscripts

As the stories of the cycle were immensely popular in medieval France and neighboring countries between the beginning of the 13th and the beginning of the 16th century, they survived in some two hundred manuscripts in various forms (not counting printed books since the late 15th century, starting with an edition of the Lancelot in 1488). The Lancelot-Graal Project website lists (and links to the scans of many of them) close to 150 manuscripts in French, some fragmentary, others, such as British Library Add MS 10292–10294, containing the entire cycle. Besides the British Library, scans of various manuscripts can be seen online through digital library websites of the Bibliothèque Nationale de France's Gallica (including these from the Bibliothèque de l'Arsenal) and the University of Oxford's Digital Bodleian; many illustrations can also be found at the IRHT's Initiale project. The earliest copies are of French origin and date from 1220 to 1230.

Numerous copies were produced in French throughout the remainder of the 13th, 14th and well into the 15th centuries in France, England and Italy, as well as translations into other European languages. Some of the manuscripts are richly illuminated: British Library Royal MS 14 E III, produced in Northern France in the early 14th century and once owned by King Charles V of France, contains over 100 miniatures with gilding throughout and decorated borders at the beginning of each section. Other manuscripts were made for less wealthy owners and contain very little or no decoration, for example British Library MS Royal 19 B VII, produced in England, also in the early 14th century, with initials in red and blue marking sections in the text and larger decorated initials at chapter-breaks. One notable manuscript is known as the Rochefoucauld Grail.

However, very few copies of the entire Lancelot-Grail Cycle survive. Perhaps because it was so vast, copies were made of parts of the legend which may have suited the tastes of certain patrons, with popular combinations containing only the tales of either Merlin or Lancelot. For instance, British Library Royal 14 E III contains the sections which deal with the Grail and religious themes, omitting the middle section, which relates Lancelot's chivalric exploits.

Legacy

Post-Vulgate Cycle

The Vulgate Cycle was soon afterwards subject to a major revision during the 1230s, in which much was left out and much added. In the resulting far-shorter Post-Vulgate Cycle, also known as the Roman du Graal, Lancelot is no longer the central character. The Post-Vulgate omits almost all of the Lancelot Proper, and consequently most of Lancelot and Guinevere's content, instead focusing on the Grail Quest. It also borrows characters and episodes from the first version of the Prose Tristan (1220), making Tristan one of the main characters.

Other reworkings and influence
The second version of the Prose Tristan (1240) itself partially incorporated the Vulgate Cycle by copying parts of it. Along with the Prose Tristan, both the Post-Vulgate and the Vulgate original were among the most important sources for Thomas Malory's seminal English compilation of Arthurian legend, Le Morte d'Arthur (1470).

The 14th-century English poem Stanzaic Morte Arthur is a compressed verse translation of the Vulgate Mort Artu. In the 15th-century Scotland, the first part of the Vulgate Lancelot was turned into verse in Lancelot of the Laik, a romance love poem with political messages. In the 15th-century England, Henry Lovelich's poem Merlin and the verse romance Of Arthour and of Merlin were based on the Vulgate Merlin and the Merlin Continuation.

Outside Britain, the Vulgate Merlin was retold in Germany by Albrecht von Scharfenberg in his lost Der Theure Mörlin, preserved over 100 years later in the "Mörlin" part of Ulrich Fuetrer's Buch von Abenteuer (1471). Jacob van Maerlant's Dutch translation of the Merlin added some original content in his Merlijns Boek also known as Historie von Merlijn (1261), as did the Italian writer Paolino Pieri in Storia di Merlino (1320). The Dutch Lancelot Compilation (1320) added an original romance to a translation of the Prose Lancelot. The Italian Vita de Merlino con le suo Prophetie also known as Historia di Merlino (1379) was losely adapted from the Vulgate Merlin.

The cycle's elements and characters have been also incorporated into various other works in France, such as Les Prophecies de Mérlin and Palamedes, and elsewhere. Some episodes from the Vulgate Cycle have been adapted into the Third and Fourth Continuations of Chrétien's unfinished Perceval, the Story of the Grail. Other legacy can be found in the many so-called "pseudo-Arthurian" works in Spain and Portugal.

Modern editions and translations

Oskar Sommer
H. Oskar Sommer published the entire original French text of the Vulgate Cycle in seven volumes in the years 1908–1916. Sommer's has been the only complete cycle published as of 2004. The base text used was the British Library Add MS 10292–10294. It is however not a critical edition, but a composite text, where variant readings from alternate manuscripts are unreliably demarcated using square brackets. 

Sommer, H. Oskar. (ed.). The Vulgate Version of the Arthurian Romances
Volume 1 of 8 (1909): Lestoire del Saint Graal.
Volume 2 of 8 (1908): Lestoire de Merlin.
Volume 3 of 8 (1910): Le livre de Lancelot del Lac, Part I.
Volume 4 of 8 (1911): Le livre de Lancelot del Lac, Part II.
Volume 5 of 8 (1912): Le livre de Lancelot del Lac, Part III.
Volume 6 of 8 (1913): Les aventures ou la queste del Saint Graal, La mort le roi Artus.
Volume 7 of 8 (1913): Supplement: Le livre d'Artus, with glossary
Volume 8 of 8 (1916): Index of names and places to volumes I-VII

Norris J. Lacy
The first full English translations of the Vulgate and Post-Vulgate cycles were overseen by Norris J. Lacy.
Lacy, Norris J. (ed.). Lancelot–Grail: The Old French Arthurian Vulgate and Post-Vulgate in Translation. New York: Garland.
Volume 1 of 5 (1 December 1992). : The History of the Holy Grail and The Story of Merlin.
Volume 2 of 5 (1 August 1993). : Lancelot, Parts I, II and III
Volume 3 of 5 (1 March 1995). : Lancelot, Parts IV, V, VI.
Volume 4 of 5 (1 April 1995). : The Quest for the Holy Grail, The Death of Arthur, and The Post-Vulgate, Part I: The Merlin Continuation
Volume 5 of 5 (1 May 1996). : The Post-Vulgate, Parts I-III: The Merlin Continuation (end), The Quest for the Holy Grail, The Death of Arthur, Chapter Summaries and Index of Proper Names
Lacy, Norris J. (ed.). The Lancelot-Grail Reader: Selections from the Medieval French Arthurian Cycle (2000). New York: Garland. 
Lacy, Norris J. (ed.). Lancelot–Grail: The Old French Arthurian Vulgate and Post-Vulgate in Translation. Cambridge: D.S. Brewer.
Ten-volume set (March 2010). .
Volume 1 of 10 (March 2010). : The History of the Holy Grail.
Volume 2 of 10 (March 2010). : The Story of Merlin.
Volume 3 of 10 (March 2010). : Lancelot, Parts I and II.
Volume 4 of 10 (March 2010). : Lancelot, Parts III and IV.
Volume 5 of 10 (October 2010). : Lancelot, Parts V and VI.
Volume 6 of 10 (March 2010). : The Quest for the Holy Grail.
Volume 7 of 10 (March 2010). : The Death of Arthur.
Volume 8 of 10 (March 2010). : The Post-Vulgate Cycle: The Merlin Continuation.
Volume 9 of 10 (October 2010). : The Post-Vulgate Cycle: The Quest for the Holy Grail and The Death of Arthur.
Volume 10 of 10 (March 2010). : Chapter Summaries for the Vulgate and Post-Vulgate Cycles and Index of Proper Names.
Lacy, Norris J. (ed.). Lancelot–Grail: The Old French Arthurian Vulgate and Post-Vulgate in Translation. Routledge Revivals. Routledge.
Five-volume set (April 19, 2010). .
Volume 1 of 5 (April 19, 2010). .
Volume 2 of 5 (April 19, 2010). .
Volume 3 of 5 (April 19, 2010). 
Volume 4 of 5 (April 19, 2010). .
Volume 5 of 5 (April 19, 2010). .

Daniel Poirion
A modern French translation of the Vulgate Cycle in three volumes:
 Poirion, Daniel. (ed.) Le Livre du Graal, Paris: Gallimard
 Volume 1 of 3 (2001): : Joseph d'Arimathie, Merlin, Les Premiers Faits du roi Arthur. 
 Volume 2 of 3 (2003): : Lancelot De La Marche de Gaule à La Première Partie de la quête de Lancelot.
 Volume 3 of 3 (2009): : Lancelot: La Seconde Partie de la quête de Lancelot, La Quête du saint Graal, La Mort du roi Arthur.

Other
 Penguin Classics published a translation into English by Pauline Matarasso of the Queste as The Quest of the Holy Grail in 1969. It was followed in 1971 with a translation by James Cable of the Mort Artu as The Death of King Arthur.
 Judith Shoaf's new Modern English translation of the Vulgate Queste was published by Broadview Press as The Quest for the Holy Grail in 2018. It contains many footnotes explaining its connections with other works of Arthurian literature.

References

Citations

Bibliography

External links
The Lancelot-Grail Project by the University of Pittsburgh
British Library Virtual Exhibition of Arthurian Manuscripts: The Prose Lancelot-Grail
An Explanation Of The Vulgate Cycle - Timeless Myths
 The legend of King Arthur on the Bibliothèque Nationale de France website ("flip-book" exhibitions: Lancelot-Graal, Histoire de Saint Graal, Histoire de Merlin, Le Roman de Lancelot, La Quête du Graal, La mort du roi Arthur)
 Bibliography on the Archives de Littérature Médiévale

1210s books
1220s books
1230s books
Arthurian literature in French
French historical novels
Holy Grail
Medieval French romances
Pseudohistory
Works based on Merlin
Works by Walter Map
Works of uncertain authorship